In Aztec religion, Ītzpāpālōtl  ("Obsidian Butterfly") was a striking skeletal warrior goddess who ruled over the paradise world of Tamoanchan, the paradise of victims of infant mortality and the place identified as where humans were created. She is the mother of Mixcoatl and is particularly associated with the moth Rothschildia orizaba from the family Saturniidae. Some of her associations are birds and fire. However, she primarily appears in the form of the Obsidian Butterfly.

Iconography
Itzpapalotl's name can either mean "obsidian butterfly" or "clawed butterfly"; the latter meaning seems most likely. It's quite possible that clawed butterfly refers to the bat and in some instances Itzpapalotl is depicted with bat wings. However, she can also appear with clear butterfly or eagle attributes. Her wings are obsidian or tecpatl (flint) knife tipped. (In the Manuscript of 1558, Itzpapalotl is described as having "blossomed into the white flint, and they took the white and wrapped it in a bundle.") She could appear in the form of a beautiful, seductive woman or terrible goddess with a skeletal head and butterfly wings supplied with stone blades. Although the identity remains inconclusive, the Zapotec deity named Goddess 2J by Alfonso Caso and Ignacio Bernal may be a Classic Zapotec form of Itzpapalotl. In many instances Goddess 2J, whose image is found on ceramic urns, is identified with bats. "In folklore, bats are sometimes called "black butterflies"". Itzpapalotl is sometimes represented as a goddess with flowing hair holding a trophy leg. The femur is thought by some scholars to have significance as a war trophy or a sacred object in Pre-Hispanic art.

Ritual

Itzpapalotl is the patron of the day and associated with the stars Cozcuauhtli and Trecena 1 House in the Aztec calendar. The Trecena 1 House is one of the five western trecena dates dedicated to the cihuateteo, or women who had died in childbirth. Not only was Itzpapalotl considered one of the cihuateteo herself, but she was also one of the tzitzimime, star demons that threatened to devour people during solar eclipses.

One of the prominent aspects of the ritual surrounding Itzpapalotl relates to the creation story of the Chichimec. The ritual is illustrated in the sixteenth century document known as the Map of Cuauhtinchan No. 2.  An illustration from this document shows Chichimec warriors emerging out of a seven-chambered cave behind Itzpapalotl. The deity is shown brandishing a severed leg, thought to be a symbol of battle. Beginning in the 1990s, archeologists exploring the  Barranca Del Aguila region, southwest of Mexico City, have discovered caves carved to simulate the seven chambered cave, known as Chicomoztoc, from the ritual creation narrative.

Mythology
According to the Manuscript of 1558, section VII, Itzpapalotl was one of two divine 2-headed doe-deers (the other one being Chimalman) who temporarily transformed themselves into women in order to seduce men. Itzpapalotl approached the two "cloud serpents named Xiuhnel  and Mimich ", who transformed themselves into men (so as to disguise themselves when all the others of the Centzonmimixcoa had been slain in the ambush?).  To Xiuhnel, Itzpapalotl said "'Drink, Xiuhnel.' Xiuhnel drank the blood and then immediately lay down with her. Suddenly she ... devoured him, tore open his breast. ...  Then Mimich ... ran and ... descended into a thorny barrel cactus, fell into it, and the woman fell down after him." In the myth-history narrative of the Annales de Cuauhtitlan, the cloud deity victims take the form of deer, the hearts of whom are eaten by Itzpapalotl. The theme of the heart devouring goddess appears in other global mythologies.

Influence on modern culture

 Orizaba the Moth Fairy, a villain in Elena of Avalor, was inspired by Itzpapalotl.
 Beyond pop culture, the name of the goddess has been used to name formations, the Itzpapalotl Tessera, on the planet Venus which are being studied for our knowledge of the geological history of our planet.
 Additionally, the goddess is one of the Pre-Columbian motifs found in California Chicano Literature.
 Ītzpāpālōtl also features prominently in the novel Obsidian Butterfly, the ninth book in the Anita Blake: Vampire Hunter series by Laurell K. Hamilton.
 She was also the monster in No One Gets Out Alive, a movie on Netflix.
 She appears in Victor and Valentino in disguise based on the folklore.
 She appears in the American fantasy horror TV series, From Dusk till Dawn: The Series, under the guise as La Llorona.

See also
Cihuateteo
Cihuacoatl
Tzitzimime
Mixcoatl
Tamoanchan
Huitzilopochtli
Tlahuizcalpanteuctli
Woman warrior
List of women warriors in folklore

Notes

References

External links
 
An image of Rothschildia orizaba

Aztec goddesses
Agricultural goddesses
Death goddesses
Mythological insects
Night goddesses
Infant mortality